This is a list of the North Macedonia national under-21 football team results and fixtures from 1994 to the present day.

1996 UEFA European Under-21 Championship

Qualification

Goalscorers

1998 UEFA European Under-21 Championship

Qualification

Goalscorers

2000 UEFA European Under-21 Championship

Qualification

Notes
A Match originally ended as a 0–0 draw, but UEFA later awarded the match as a 3–0 forfeit win to Republic of Ireland due to Macedonia including ineligible players in their squad.

Goalscorers

2002 UEFA European Under-21 Championship

Qualification

Goalscorers

2004 UEFA European Under-21 Championship

Qualification

Goalscorers

2006 UEFA European Under-21 Championship

Qualification

Goalscorers

2007 UEFA European Under-21 Championship

Qualification

Preliminary round

Group stage

Goalscorers

2009 UEFA European Under-21 Championship

Qualification

Goalscorers

2011 UEFA European Under-21 Championship

Qualification

Goalscorers

2013 UEFA European Under-21 Championship

Qualification

Goalscorers

2015 UEFA European Under-21 Championship

Qualification

Notes

Goalscorers

2017 UEFA European Under-21 Championship

Qualification

Goalscorers

Group stage

Goalscorers

2019 UEFA European Under-21 Championship

Qualification

Goalscorers

2021 UEFA European Under-21 Championship

Qualification

Goalscorers

2023 UEFA European Under-21 Championship

Qualification

Goalscorers

Friendlies

Source: MacedonianFootball.com

References

External links
 All matches of the Macedonia national under-21 football team

Under-21
Results